Ricardo Teruel (born January 1956 in Caracas) is a Venezuelan composer and pianist.

Life 
Teruel worked since 1983 at the Instituto de Fonología of the Centro Simón Bolívar. Since 1988, he is the Director of the Laboratory for Electronic Music. Since 1990 he is a Professor for composition and electronic music at the Instituto Universitario de Estudios Musicales (IUDEM) and teaches at the Conservatorio Simón Bolívar.

Works 

Laberinto sin salida for Piano (1974)
El Zamural  (1975)
Nuestra Cultura Vegeta for audio tape recording (1976)
Flash 5 (1977)
Juego de manos es de villanos (1981)
Hojas de Olvido for electronic instruments (1981)
Orquestada Nº 3 for piano and eighteen Instruments (1983)
Pobre música electrónica pobre (1983)
A ver si nos entendemos for piano and electronic instruments (1983)
Um-um-é-hum-ah for electronic instruments (1984)
Un minuto de silencio por favor (o ni en sueños) for electronic instruments (1984)
Glooskap y Lindú (1984)
Dar for Flute, Violin, Cello, drums and piano (1985) 
Seis poemas de César Vallejo for Mezzo-soprano and piano (1985)
Orquestada Nº 6: El fresco aroma de viejos placeres for Orchestra (1985)
Orquestada Nº 7: La Gran Aldea for Orchestra and/or electronic instruments (1985)
Suave, suave, fluye suave; fluye, fluye, suave fluye for piano four hands and/or electronic instruments(1986)
¡Que sí te lo digo! for two Piccolos (1986)
Huellas de Voces Perdidas for synthesizer (1986)
La Cacería del NHOC for electronic instruments (1986)
Rayas de Tigre for vibraphon and concertino (1986)
Amantes (y su epílogo Amigos) for cello and piano (1987)
El Macromicrobio for doublebass and electronic instruments (1988)
Típico Tópico Trópico Trío for Violin and Cello (1989)
El Niño de la Mirada Clara, children opera (Libretto by the composer) (1989–1995)
Tan claro como el agua (after a work by Mexican Choreographer Beatriz Madrid for three clarinets, accordion and drums (1990–91)
Esencia en escena for piano (1991)
Cinco canciones ¿ingenuas? (1995)
Toccata for piano (1995)
3 Piezas para Liralata y sonidos electrónicos grabados (1996)
Concertino Nº1 for concertino and string orchestra (1996)
Cuarteto con piano Nº1 (1996–1997)
Mojiganga Nº1 for Symphonic orchestra (1998)
Sonrisa de Mujer concert for Harp and Symphonic orchestra (1998–1999)
¿¡Qué tal!? ¿cuál es cuál? for Flute and Harp (1999)
Energías Liberadas (1999)
Dos piezas para dos con bolsas (2000)
Cuaderno Nº1 de Piezas para concertina inglesa tenor sola (2000–2005)
Concertino Nº 2 for concertino and Orchestra (2002–2003)
Cascadas de Risa Perlada for Flute and clarinet (2004)
Manada for Marimba (2004)111

External links 
Website Ricardo Teruel

References

20th-century classical composers
21st-century classical composers
Venezuelan music educators
Musicians from Caracas
Postmodern composers
Venezuelan classical composers
1956 births
Living people